Emad Abdelhalim Ali is an amateur boxer from Egypt.

Career
Ali is best known for having won the gold medal in the men's super heavyweight division at the 2007 All-Africa Games.

In 2006, he still competed at 201 lbs and lost in the first round of the Ahmed Öner Cup to Ali Mazaheri by RSCO. He beat Guy Bakutu Batangule (ZAI) 17:4, Mohamed Homrani (TUN) 17:11 and in the final local hero Newfel Ouatah (ALG) 17:8.

References
Results

Year of birth missing (living people)
Living people
Egyptian male boxers
African Games gold medalists for Egypt
African Games medalists in boxing
Competitors at the 2007 All-Africa Games
Super-heavyweight boxers
21st-century Egyptian people